Henry Smyth (January 15, 1841 – December 23, 1929) was a lawyer and political figure in Ontario, Canada. He represented Kent in the House of Commons of Canada from 1882 to 1887 as a Conservative member.

He was born in Chatham, Upper Canada, the son of William B. Smyth, a native of Ireland, and was educated there and at the Caradoc Academy. In 1862, he married Julia O'Brien. Smyth served as school trustee, town councillor, deputy reeve and reeve; he was also mayor of Chatham from 1869 to 1870 and in 1876. His election in 1882 was overturned in 1883 after an appeal; Smyth won the by-election held in 1884. He was unsuccessful when he ran for reelection in 1887 and 1888.

References 
 
 The Canadian parliamentary companion, 1883, AJ Gemmill

1841 births
1929 deaths
Members of the House of Commons of Canada from Ontario
Conservative Party of Canada (1867–1942) MPs
Mayors of places in Ontario